Ithu Oru Thudakkom Mathram is a 1986 Indian Malayalam film, directed by Baby and produced by V. Rajan.  The film has musical score by Rajamani.

Cast

Ratheesh 
Devan 
T. G. Ravi 
Balan K. Nair 
C. I. Paul 
Ramu 
Prathapachandran 
Sumithra

Soundtrack
The music was composed by Rajamani and the lyrics were written by Vasan and U. Radhakrishnan.

References

External links
 

1986 films
1980s Malayalam-language films
Films directed by Baby (director)